The 1963–64 NBA season was the Celtics' 18th season in the NBA. The Celtics finished the season by winning their seventh NBA Championship.

Offseason

NBA Draft

Roster

Regular season 
The Celtics were one of the dominant teams in the leagues. The team established its legacy as one of the game's greatest dynasties ever. 1950s superstar Bob Cousy had retired, yet Red Auerbach's club barely slowed down with his absence. Cousy's replacement was a defensive specialist named K. C. Jones, who continued Auerbach's emphasis on defense along with forward Tom 'Satch' Sanders and center Bill Russell. While Boston could surely still pass and score, it was their defensive emergence, led by the incredible Russell, that was now leading a streak of NBA titles. Russell led the league in rebounds and was one of two high-volume shot blockers dominating the NBA. The Celtics had six scorers over ten-points per game and two more over eight. Auerbach's sixth man, John Havlicek, was the team's leading scorer at 20 per game. This combination of active defense and unselfish shooting got Boston a league-high 59 wins in 80 NBA games.

Season standings

Record vs. opponents

Game log

Playoffs 

|- align="center" bgcolor="#ccffcc"
| 1
| March 31
| Cincinnati
| W 103–87
| Sam Jones (27)
| Bill Russell (31)
| K. C. Jones (9)
| Boston Garden13,909
| 1–0
|- align="center" bgcolor="#ccffcc"
| 2
| April 2
| Cincinnati
| W 101–90
| Tom Heinsohn (31)
| Bill Russell (28)
| K. C. Jones (8)
| Boston Garden13,909
| 2–0
|- align="center" bgcolor="#ccffcc"
| 3
| April 5
| @ Cincinnati
| W 102–92
| Bill Russell (22)
| Bill Russell (28)
| K. C. Jones (6)
| Cincinnati Gardens11,850
| 3–0
|- align="center" bgcolor="#ffcccc"
| 4
| April 7
| @ Cincinnati
| L 93–102
| Sam Jones (33)
| Bill Russell (24)
| K. C. Jones (5)
| Cincinnati Gardens
| 3–1
|- align="center" bgcolor="#ccffcc"
| 5
| April 9
| Cincinnati
| W 109–95
| Sam Jones (23)
| Bill Russell (35)
| Russell, K. C. Jones (7)
| Boston Garden13,909
| 4–1
|-

|- align="center" bgcolor="#ccffcc"
| 1
| April 18
| San Francisco
| W 108–96
| Sam Jones (28)
| Bill Russell (25)
| K. C. Jones (7)
| Boston Garden13,909
| 1–0
|- align="center" bgcolor="#ccffcc"
| 2
| April 20
| San Francisco
| W 124–101
| Sam Jones (31)
| Bill Russell (24)
| Bill Russell (9)
| Boston Garden13,909
| 2–0
|- align="center" bgcolor="#ffcccc"
| 3
| April 22
| @ San Francisco
| L 91–115
| John Havlicek (22)
| Bill Russell (32)
| K. C. Jones (8)
| Cow Palace10,981
| 2–1
|- align="center" bgcolor="#ccffcc"
| 4
| April 24
| @ San Francisco
| W 98–95
| Tom Heinsohn (25)
| Bill Russell (19)
| K. C. Jones (5)
| Cow Palace14,862
| 3–1
|- align="center" bgcolor="#ccffcc"
| 5
| April 26
| San Francisco
| W 105–99
| Tom Heinsohn (19)
| Bill Russell (26)
| Bill Russell (6)
| Boston Garden13,909
| 4–1
|-

Awards and honors 
Bill Russell, All-NBA Second Team
Tom Heinsohn, All-NBA Second Team
John Havlicek, All-NBA Second Team

References 

 Celtics on Database Basketball
  Celtics on Basketball Reference

Boston Celtics seasons
NBA championship seasons
Boston Celtics
Boston Celtics
Boston Celtics
1960s in Boston